In the Shadow of Fear ( Sti skia tou fovou) is a 1988 Greek drama film directed by Giorgos Karypidis. The film was selected as the Greek entry for the Best Foreign Language Film at the 61st Academy Awards, but was not accepted as a nominee.

Cast
 Giorgos Konstas

See also
 List of submissions to the 61st Academy Awards for Best Foreign Language Film
 List of Greek submissions for the Academy Award for Best Foreign Language Film

References

External links
 

1988 films
1988 drama films
Greek drama films
1980s Greek-language films
1988 directorial debut films